A Love Story is a 2007 Filipino romantic drama film about a successful but emotionally scarred businessman Ian Montes (Aga Muhlach) who is torn between two women: Joanna (Maricel Soriano) a doctor and Karyn (Angelica Panganiban) a flight attendant. On August 26, 2007, the cast of A Love Story flew to the United States for the American premiere of the movie.

The film was digitally restored and remastered by the ABS-CBN Film Restoration Project and Central Digital Lab; the restored version was premiered digitally through KTX.ph on August 17, 2021.

Plot
What if you met the woman you wanted to make your wife after
you married someone else? Ian Montes is a picture of success.
Despite being a son of a shipping tycoon, Ian refused to just
coast on his father's empire; he built his own real-estate
company and earned his first million at a very young age. He
never looked back since then. Driven by his ambition to become
better than, if not as good as his father, Ian managed to make it
on his own. But behind all the glory is a man yearning for love
and recognition. Wounded from his mother's abandonment when
he was 17 and desperate for his father's approval, Ian longed for
someone who could and would love him unconditionally. He felt
this twice when he met two particular women: Joanna and Karyn.
Joanna Villanueva is a picture of quiet confidence and success.
Healing from heartbreak caused by an errant ex-husband,
Joanna found love again when she rescued Ian from a water-
skiing accident in La Union. Being a doctor, Joanna nurtured Ian
and showered him with love and attention. With Joanna, Ian
found the home he sorely missed and a life of bliss he never
thought he could have. But there is also Karyn Torres, a flight
attendant he met en route to Macau for a business trip. At 24,
Karyn is the epitome of youthful sensuality and worldliness. With
Karyn, every moment is filled with excitement and spontaneity.
With Karyn, Ian found the life he's always wanted. So he's left
with a choice. In the end, Ian, Joanna, and Karyn learn—painfully—the true meaning of unconditional love and
forgiveness.

Cast and characters

Main cast
Maricel Soriano as Joanna Villanueva
Aga Muhlach as Ian Montes
Angelica Panganiban as Karyn Torres

Supporting cast
Dante Rivero as Sergio Montes
Chin Chin Gutierrez as Concha
Bobby Andrews as Roy
TJ Trinidad as Rick Montes
Baron Geisler as Macky
John Arcilla as Steve
Gerald Madrid as Jake Villanueva
Mark Acueza as Jason
Bart Guingona as Hector Villanueva
R.S. Francisco as Dr. Philip
Anita Linda as Inang Sion
Eva Darren as Delia
Ara Hanesh as Claudia
Sophia Baars as Joanna's niece

Awards and recognitions

Box office
A Love Story has grossed P 139,611,177.10 and it ran for 8 weeks. A Love Story was no. 1 in 3 weeks beating the Hollywood movie Bourne Ultimatum starring Matt Damon which also premiered August 15, 2007.

Trivia
After 11 years, Soriano and Panganiban both reunited in Ama, Ina, Anak released in February 1996 and later in Vietnam Rose that aired from September 2005 to February 2006 almost 2 years later. Also, Panganiban left the series Rounin with her co-star TJ Trinidad since it ended on July 26, 3 weeks later.

References

External links

2007 films
2000s Tagalog-language films
2007 romantic drama films
Star Cinema drama films
Philippine romantic drama films
Films set in the Philippines
Films directed by Maryo J. de los Reyes